Three to Conquer is a novel by Eric Frank Russell published in 1956.

Plot summary
Three to Conquer is a novel in which a telepath battles alien invaders who infect and take over people.

Reception
Dave Langford reviewed Three to Conquer for White Dwarf #99, and stated that "Methuen have struck a blow for SF tradition by commissioning covers you're embarrassed to be seen holding on a bus."

Reviews
 Murray King (1956) in Future Science Fiction, #31, Winter 1956-1957
 Anthony Boucher (1957) in The Magazine of Fantasy and Science Fiction, January 1957
 Villiers Gerson (1957) in Fantastic, February 1957
 P. Schuyler Miller (1957) in Astounding Science Fiction, March 1957
 Henry Bott (1957) in Imagination, April 1957
 P. Schuyler Miller (1958) in Astounding Science Fiction, January 1958

References

1956 novels